Lasith Croospulle (born 10 October 1998) is a Sri Lankan cricketer. He made his Twenty20 debut for Negombo Cricket Club in the 2017–18 SLC Twenty20 Tournament on 24 February 2018. He made his List A debut for Negombo Cricket Club in the 2017–18 Premier Limited Overs Tournament on 10 March 2018. In August 2021, he was named in the SLC Greys team for the 2021 SLC Invitational T20 League tournament.

In April 2022, Sri Lanka Cricket (SLC) named him in the Sri Lanka Emerging Team's squad for their tour to England. In June 2022, he was named in the Sri Lanka A squad for their matches against Australia A during Australia's tour of Sri Lanka.

In July 2022, he was signed by the Dambulla Giants for the third edition of the Lanka Premier League.

References

External links
 

1998 births
Living people
Sri Lankan cricketers
Negombo Cricket Club cricketers
Place of birth missing (living people)
South Asian Games silver medalists for Sri Lanka
South Asian Games medalists in cricket